The 1992–93 Auburn Tigers men's basketball team represented Auburn University in the 1992–93 college basketball season. The team's head coach was Tommy Joe Eagles, who was in his fourth season at Auburn. The team played their home games at Joel H. Eaves Memorial Coliseum in Auburn, Alabama. They finished the season 15–12, 8–8 in SEC play. They lost to Tennessee in the first round of the SEC tournament. They received an invitation to the National Invitation Tournament, where they lost to Clemson in the first round.

Schedule and Results

|-
!colspan=9 style="background:#172240; color:white;"| Regular season

|-
!colspan=9 style="background:#172240; color:white;"| SEC Tournament

|-
!colspan=9 style="background:#172240; color:white;"| National Invitational Tournament

References

Auburn Tigers men's basketball seasons
Auburn
Auburn
Auburn
Auburn